The Fletcher International Insolvency Law Moot or Fletcher Moot is an international moot court competition on international insolvency law and international commercial litigation. The moot, which is named after Professor Ian Fletcher, was established in 2017 as the first ever moot on cross-border insolvency law. The venue of the moot rotates every year and has thus far been held in four countries.

There is one qualifying written round for which the top 8–12 submissions are chosen out of a field of 20–30 teams, and the oral round finals are held in conjunction with conference proceedings organised by, among others, INSOL International and the International Insolvency Institute. For the oral phase, each team argues in up to four preliminary matches; in the first two editions, the top four teams qualified for the knockout stages. In 2019, quarterfinals were introduced for the first time.

The 2021 edition went fully online as travel restrictions remained in place due to COVID-19; teams mooted sitting down instead of standing up, with no option for team members being located in the same venue. The 2022 edition was also run entirely online, as will be the 2023 edition.

References

External links
 Official website

Moot court competitions